The 2018 Prince Edward Island Scotties Tournament of Hearts, the provincial women's curling championship for Prince Edward Island, was held January 4–9 at the Cornwall Curling Club in Cornwall, Prince Edward Island. The winning Robyn MacPhee team represented Prince Edward Island at the 2018 Scotties Tournament of Hearts.

Teams Entered
The Robyn MacPhee rink are the defending champions.

Knockout draw brackets

A Event

B Event

C Event

Playoffs
Game 2 was not needed as Team MacPhee needed to be beaten twice.

Semifinal
Sunday, January 7, 1:00 pm

References

PEI Scotties Tournament of Hearts
2018 in Prince Edward Island
January 2018 sports events in Canada
Curling competitions in Prince Edward Island
Queens County, Prince Edward Island